Gareth Cook (born September 15, 1969) is an American journalist and editor. He was awarded a Pulitzer Prize in 2005 for “explaining, with clarity and humanity, the complex scientific and ethical dimensions of stem cell research.” Cook is a contributing writer for The New York Times Magazine, is also the series editor of The Best American Infographics and editor of Mind Matters, Scientific American's neuroscience blog. His writing has appeared in The New York Times Magazine, The Boston Globe, Wired, and Scientific American.

Career
Cook graduated from Brown University in 1991 with degrees in Mathematical Physics and International Relations. He was an assistant editor at Foreign Policy, a scholarly journal based in Washington, DC. He then worked as a reporter at U.S. News & World Report, and then as an editor at the Washington Monthly. He was the news editor of The Boston Phoenix, an alternative weekly based in Boston, from 1996 to 1999. 
In 1999, he started at The Boston Globe, and worked for seven years as the paper's science reporter, covering a  variety of topics, including biology, physics, paleontology, archeology, the role of women in science and scientific fraud. He was one of the founders of The Boston Globe'''s Ideas section, and then served as its editor from 2007 to 2011. He is now freelance writer. 
  
His stories have twice appeared in Best American Science and Nature Writing: "The Autism Advantage," from the New York Times Magazine, and “Untangling the Mystery of the Inca,” from Wired''. He wrote a story arguing that Japan did not surrender at the end of World War II because of the atomic bomb.

Awards
Pulitzer Prize (2005)
National Academies Communication Award (2005)
Woods Hole Oceanographic Institution Ocean Science Journalism Award (2005)

Personal life
He lives in Jamaica Plain, Mass., with his wife, Amanda, and his two sons, Aidan and Oliver.
In 2003 he revealed that he is dyslexic.

References

1969 births
Living people
20th-century American journalists
American male journalists
The Boston Globe people
Brown University alumni
Pulitzer Prize for Explanatory Journalism winners
Scientific American people
Writers with dyslexia